Girolamo Mazzola Bedoli (c. 1500–1569) was an Italian painter active in the Mannerist style.

Biography
Bedoli was born in Parma in a family coming from Viadana in Lombardy. He was a near contemporary of Parmigianino, and after the early death of the latter master, he completed some frescoes initially commissioned from Parmigianino. For example, he completed works in the apse of Santa Maria della Steccata. He is known to have worked in the studio of the Parmigianino's uncles in the city of Parma. He married the daughter of Pier Ilaro Mazzola, a cousin of Parmigianino, hence he added to his name the better known Mazzola appellation.

He painted along with his father in law the Immaculate Conception for the Oratorio della Concezione (now in Parma Gallery). Freedberg describes him in his masterpiece of the Annunciation as resembling Parmigianino in the same way Bronzino reflected the elder Pontormo, equal in skill and refinement, but lacking the original abstracting poetry of the image. Bedoli's works are equal in polish, but stony in feeling. He produced murals, portraits, designed tombs, and altarpieces — the diverse uses probably trained him best as a decorative artist. His son, Alessandro Mazzola (painter) (1533–1608), was an undistinguished painter.

Selected works

Most of Bedoli's works are not signed.  Many works are attributed to him based on style, but often these attributions are disputed. Among the works attributed to Bedoli are the following:

References

Notes

16th-century Italian painters
Italian male painters
Painters from Parma
Renaissance painters
1500s births
1569 deaths